Omar Haji Mohamed Masalle was a commander of the Somali military in the Hiiraan Region, which is located in Central Somalia. Before he joined the military, he was a language teacher. He also became a Somali Minister of Defence and health minister.

Masale was one of the commanding officers of the 1977 Ogaden War. Masale was the second deputy to the joint chiefs of staff and the head of the 2nd armored division (formerly 2nd Brigade).

References 

Ethnic Somali people
Somalian military leaders
1934 births
2014 deaths